Denby Taylor (born 19 February 2000) is a retired Australian rules footballer who played with the Geelong Football Club in the AFL Women's (AFLW).

Taylor grew up in Geelong, Victoria with her parents, Pete and Pauline, and three older sisters, Casey, Dom & Jordan. She attended Sacred Heart College for school, and played football at junior level with Newtown & Chilwell Football Club. Taylor played with the Geelong Falcons in the TAC Cup in 2017 and 2018, winning the premiership in the latter year, and was named in the league's "Team of the Year" in both seasons.

Taylor was subsequently drafted with selection number 20 in the 2018 AFL Women's draft by Geelong, and made her AFLW debut during the first round of the 2019 season, against Collingwood at GMHBA Stadium.

In June 2022, Taylor retired from football, following a season on the inactive list.

References

External links 

Geelong Football Club (AFLW) players
2000 births
Living people
Australian rules footballers from Victoria (Australia)
Sportswomen from Victoria (Australia)
Geelong Falcons players (NAB League Girls)